The Gnaphalieae are a tribe of flowering plants in the family Asteraceae. It is most closely related to the tribes Anthemideae, Astereae, and Calenduleae.

Characteristics
This group is most diverse in South America, Southern Africa and Australia. There are only a few genera with species native to temperate regions: Anaphalis, Antennaria, Gamochaeta, Helichrysum, Leontopodium (Edelweiss), Phagnalon, Diaperia, and Pseudognaphalium.

The classification of the tribe into subtribes is unclear, with a number of past classifications not being supported by late 20th-century evidence.

Genera
Gnaphalieae genera recognized by the Global Compositae Database as April 2022:

× Filfia 
Acanthocladium 
Achyrocline 
Acomis 
Actinobole 
Alatoseta 
Ammobium 
Amphiglossa 
Anaphalioides 
Anaphalis 
Anaxeton 
Ancistrocarphus 
Anderbergia 
Anemocarpa 
Angianthus 
Antennaria 
Apalochlamys 
Argentipallium 
Argyroglottis 
Argyrotegium 
Arrowsmithia 
Asteridea 
Athrixia 
Atrichantha 
Basedowia 
Bellida 
Belloa 
Berroa 
Blennospora 
Bombycilaena 
Bryomorphe 
Calocephalus 
Calomeria 
Calotesta 
Cassinia 
Castroviejoa 
Catatia 
Cephalipterum 
Cephalosorus 
Chamaepus 
Chevreulia 
Chiliocephalum 
Chionolaena 
Chondropyxis 
Chryselium 
Chrysocephalum 
Chthonocephalus 
Cladochaeta 
Coronidium 
Craspedia 
Cremnothamnus 
Cuatrecasasiella 
Dasyanthus 
Decazesia 
Diaperia 
Dicerothamnus 
Dielitzia 
Disparago 
Dithyrostegia 
Dolichothrix 
Edmondia 
Elytropappus 
Epitriche 
Eriochlamys 
Erymophyllum 
Euchiton 
Ewartia 
Ewartiothamnus 
Facelis 
Feldstonia 
Filago 
Fitzwillia 
Fluminaria 
Galeomma 
Gamochaeta 
Gilberta 
Gilruthia 
Gnaphaliothamnus 
Gnaphalium 
Gnephosis 
Gnomophalium 
Gratwickia 
Haeckeria 
Haegiela 
Haptotrichion 
Helichrysopsis 
Helichrysum 
Hesperevax 
Humeocline 
Hyalochlamys 
Hyalosperma 
Hydroidea 
Ifloga 
Ixiolaena 
Ixodia 
Jalcophila 
Lachnospermum 
Langebergia 
Laphangium 
Lasiopogon 
Lawrencella 
Leiocarpa 
Lemooria 
Leontopodium 
Lepidostephium 
Leptorhynchos 
Leucochrysum 
Leucogenes 
Leucophyta 
Leysera 
Logfia 
Loricaria 
Lucilia 
Metalasia 
Mexerion 
Micropsis 
Micropus 
Millotia 
Mniodes 
Myriocephalus 
Myrovernix 
Neotysonia 
Nestlera 
Odixia 
Oedera 
Ozothamnus 
Paenula 
Parantennaria 
Pentatrichia 
Petalacte 
Phaenocoma 
Phagnalon 
Pithocarpa 
Plecostachys 
Podolepis 
Podotheca 
Pogonolepis 
Polycalymma 
Pseudognaphalium 
Psilocarphus 
Pterochaeta 
Pterygopappus 
Pycnosorus 
Quinetia 
Quinqueremulus 
Rachelia 
Raoulia 
Raouliopsis 
Rhetinocarpha 
Rhodanthe 
Rhynchopsidium 
Rutidosis 
Schoenia 
Scyphocoronis 
Seriphium 
Siemssenia 
Siloxerus 
Sinoleontopodium 
Sondottia 
Stenocline 
Stenophalium 
Stoebe 
Stuartina 
Stylocline 
Swammerdamia 
Syncarpha 
Syncephalum 
Taplinia 
Tenrhynea 
Thiseltonia 
Tietkensia 
Toxanthes 
Trichanthodium 
Triptilodiscus 
Troglophyton 
Vellereophyton 
Waitzia 
Xerochrysum

Other genera
Sources: FNA

References

External links 

 
Asteraceae tribes